Trichinella britovi is a nematode parasite responsible for a zoonotic disease called trichinellosis. Currently, eight species of Trichinella are known, only three of which cause trichinellosis, and Trichinella britovi is one of them. Numerous mammal species, as well as birds and crocodiles, can harbor the parasite worldwide, but the sylvatic cycle is mainly maintained by wild carnivores.   

Humans represent only a possible host and the parasite is exclusively transmitted through consumption of raw or Rare Meat. In Europe, pork and wild boar meat are the main sources for human infection.

Because of mandatory veterinary controls in slaughterhouses, large trichinellosis outbreaks due to horse-meat consumption are rare, but cases in hunters and their families after raw or rare wild boar meat consumption are regularly reported, with over 100 cases since 1975.

T. britovi in wild boar is relatively resistant to freezing. In France, meat from naturally infected wild boar meat frozen for three weeks at  remained infectious, whereas the parasites were not viable after four weeks.

In the 1960s, "trichinella infection" was documented in Senegal, West Africa. A survey of 160 wild animals from that region produced plausible evidence that European strains may have originated in Africa. It has also been proposed that strains of T. britovi are isolated to both African and European populations.

Three cases of human trichinellosis due to T. britovi were reported in 2015 in the Southeast of France resulting from consumption of raw pork sausages (figatelli) prepared in Corsica. Fourteen other people ate figatelli from the same batch, but were not infected due to the figatelli being well cooked.

Prevention

References 

Trichocephalida
Parasitic nematodes of vertebrates
Parasitic nematodes of humans
Parasites of equines
Parasites of reptiles